The 2022 Berkeley Tennis Club Challenge was a professional tennis tournament played on outdoor hard courts. It was the fourth edition of the tournament which was part of the 2022 ITF Women's World Tennis Tour. It took place in Berkeley, California, United States between 19 and 25 September 2022.

Champions

Singles

  Madison Brengle def.  Yuan Yue, 6–7(3–7), 6–3, 6–2

Doubles

  Elvina Kalieva /  Peyton Stearns def.  Allura Zamarripa /  Maribella Zamarripa, 7–6(7–5), 7–6(7–5)

Singles main draw entrants

Seeds

 1 Rankings are as of 12 September 2022.

Other entrants
The following players received wildcards into the singles main draw:
  Jenna DeFalco
  Rachel Gailis
  Maegan Manasse
  Johanne Svendsen

The following player received entry into the singles main draw using a protected ranking:
  Maria Mateas

The following players received entry from the qualifying draw:
  Jessica Luisa Alsola
  Kylie Collins
  Makenna Jones
  Robin Montgomery
  Hannah Viller Møller
  Katja Wiersholm
  Lisa Zaar
  Maribella Zamarripa

References

External links
 2022 Berkeley Tennis Club Challenge at ITFtennis.com
 Official website

2022 ITF Women's World Tennis Tour
2022 in American tennis
September 2022 sports events in the United States